Swakula Sali (also known as Swakulasali, Swakulasale. and Sali or Rugwedsali) is an ethnic community found among Hindus in India. They claim descent from the Jivheshwara. Marathi is the primary language spoken by the Swakula Salis, who also speak local dialects. Their primary professions is weaving. It was Swakula Salis who first created Narayanpet silk and cotton factory. They are of Kshatriyas origin.

Religion

The swakula salis are direct descendants of Lord Jihveshwara ( Lord Mahadeva) and command very high status in the Hindu society.Later they were regarded as Brahmin origin due to their adept command over rigveda and samveda and their contributions to them.At some point of history they were not satisfied performing only mundane brahmanical rituals hence due to high social affinity and responsibility became Kshatriya as well.They were supposed to spread Vedic knowledge travelling from one place to another and also earn livelihood with their expertise in clothes weaving technology  and trading which included clothes for the nobility , aristocracy and also the Gods.

References

External links
Wikipedia of Swakul Sali samaj

Indian castes